Acer sempervirens, the Cretan maple, is a species of maple native to southern Greece and southern Turkey.

Acer sempervirens is an evergreen or semi-evergreen shrub or small tree, one of the very few evergreen species in the genus. The bark is dark grey, smooth in young trees, becoming scaly and shallowly fissured in mature trees. The shoots are green at first, becoming dull brown in the second year. The flowers are yellow-green, produced in small pendulous corymbs.

It is one of the most drought- and heat-tolerant species in the genus, occurring on dry, sunny hillsides at moderate elevations. It is closely related to Acer monspessulanum from further north and west in Europe, differing from it in being a smaller, often shrubby tree, and in its smaller, evergreen leaves.

Cultivation and uses
Cretan maple is occasionally grown as an ornamental tree in western Europe; it was introduced to Britain in 1752.

References

External links

sempervirens
Flora of Greece
Flora of Turkey
Plants described in 1767
Taxa named by Carl Linnaeus